Lee Edward Bowers Jr. (January 12, 1925 – August 9, 1966) was a witness to the assassination of United States President John F. Kennedy in Dallas, Texas on November 22, 1963. 
The timing and circumstances of Bowers' death have led to various allegations that his demise was part of a cover-up subsequent to the Kennedy murder.

Early life and career
Bowers served in the U.S. Navy from ages 17 to 21. He attended Hardin-Simmons University for two years then Southern Methodist University for two years, majoring in religion. He worked for the Union Terminal Co. railyard for 15 years, also working as a self-employed builder. In 1964, he began working as business manager for a hospital and convalescent home.

Assassination of Kennedy
At the moment of the assassination, Bowers was operating the Union Terminal Company's two-story interlocking tower, overlooking the parking lot around 120 yards north of the grassy knoll and west of the Texas School Book Depository.

He had an unobstructed view of the rear of the concrete pergola and the stockade fence at the top of the grassy knoll. He described hearing three shots that came from either the Depository on his left or near the mouth of the Triple Underpass railroad bridge on his right; he was unsure because of the reverberation from the shots.

Witness to JFK assassination
On April 2, 1964, Lee Bowers provided testimony to Joseph A. Ball, assistant counsel of the Warren Commission, at the US Post Office Building in Dallas. When asked by Ball, "Now, were there any people standing on the high side — high ground between your tower and where Elm Street goes down under the underpass toward the mouth of the underpass?" Bowers testified that at the time the motorcade went by on Elm Street, four men were in the area: one or two uniformed parking lot attendants, one of whom Bowers knew; and two men standing 10 to 15 feet (3 to 5 m) apart near the Triple Underpass, who did not appear to know each other. One was "middle-aged, or slightly older, fairly heavy-set, in a white shirt, fairly dark trousers" and the other was "younger man, about midtwenties, in either a plaid shirt or plaid coat or jacket." One or both were still there when the first police officer arrived "immediately" after the shooting. Many assumed that Bowers meant that these men were standing behind the stockade fence at the top of the grassy knoll.

Bowers further stated : "At the time of the shooting there seemed to be some commotion (...)" on the high ground above Elm Street. When asked about this commotion, he added : "I just am unable to describe rather than it was something out of the ordinary, a sort of milling around, but something occurred in this particular spot which was out of the ordinary, which attracted my eye for some reason, which I could not identify."

Two years later when Bowers was interviewed by assassination researchers Mark Lane and Emile de Antonio for their documentary film Rush to Judgment, he clarified that these two men were standing in the opening between the pergola and the stockade fence, and that "no one" was behind the fence when the shots were fired. Bowers said,

These two men were standing back from the street somewhat at the top of the incline and were very near two trees which were in the area. And one of them, from time to time as he walked back and forth, disappeared behind a wooden fence which is also slightly to the west of that. These two men to the best of my knowledge were standing there at the time of the shooting.

Bowers added, 

Now I could see back or the South side of the wooden fence in the area, so that obviously that there was no one there who could have - uh - had anything to do with either - as accomplice or anything else because there was no one there - um - at the moment that the shots were fired. 

Bowers told Lane that as the motorcade passed "there was a flash of light or smoke" in the vicinity of where the two men were standing.

Death
Bowers died in August 1966, when his car left an empty road and struck a concrete bridge abutment near Midlothian, Texas.

Portrayals

Bowers was played by Pruitt Taylor Vince in the 1991 film JFK.

References

Citations

Works cited

External links
Biography of Lee Bowers
Bowers' testimony and Oliver Stone's Film
Up by the Triple Underpass

1925 births
1966 deaths
Witnesses to the assassination of John F. Kennedy
Businesspeople from Dallas
Military personnel from Texas
Hardin–Simmons University alumni
Southern Methodist University alumni
Road incident deaths in Texas
United States Navy personnel of World War II